The Royal Fine Art Commission for Scotland was a Scottish public body.

It was appointed in 1927 "to enquire into such questions of public amenity or of artistic importance relating to Scotland as may be referred to them by any of our Departments of State and to report thereon to such Departments; and furthermore, to give advice on similar questions when so requested by public or quasi-public bodies when it appears to the said Commission that their assistance would be advantageous".

The first Commissioners were-

Sir John Maxwell Stirling-Maxwell
Gavin George, Baron Hamilton of Dalzell
Sir John Ritchie Findlay
Sir George Macdonald
Sir George Washington Browne 
Sir Robert Stodart Lorimer
James Whitelaw Hamilton 
James Pittendrigh Macgillivray

In 2005, it was replaced by Architecture and Design Scotland.

See also
 Royal Fine Art Commission, formerly operated in England and Wales

References

1927 establishments in Scotland
2005 disestablishments in Scotland
Organisations based in Scotland with royal patronage
Architecture in Scotland
Scottish design
Public bodies of the Scottish Government
Arts organisations based in Scotland
Scottish commissions and inquiries
Arts organizations established in 1927
Organizations disestablished in 2005